Keriya Town or Mugala Town is a town in Yutian (Keriya) County, Hotan Prefecture, Xinjiang, China, on the old Southern Silk Road. As the commercial and administrative centre of Keriya County, it is about 166 km east of Hotan, 80 km east of Qira, and 120 km west of Niya. Yutian County has a population of about 160,000.

History
The small modern town of Keriya is situated on the western bank of the Keriya River. Approximately 180 km north along the Keriya River is the ancient fortified site of Karadong, where the world's oldest Buddhist murals have been found. It was abandoned in the 4th century CE. Another site, Yuan Sha, some 40 km north of Karadong, dates from the Iron Age but was abandoned by about 130 BCE.

There is a village about 75 km south of Keriya called Pulu. There are a number of peaks over 6,000 metres to the south of the oasis, including Qong Muztag at 6,962 m (22,841 ft) in the upper Keriya River Valley. About 100 families of the distinctive Keriya Uyghurs, who are said to be quite distinct from other Uyghurs, live at Tangzubasti Village, about 170 km north of the town of Yutian. It is said to be on the ruins of the ancient city of Keladun where artifacts from the Han Dynasty (206 BCE – 222 CE) have been found.

Marco Polo visited the oasis in the late 13th century. He described it as being five days' journey in extent, but with sandy deserts to both east and west. Both the province and the capital city were called Pem or Peyn. He noted that the people were Muslims, and that there were many towns and villages.  He indicated that there were plenty of products there, including cotton.  He also mentions that "jasper" (probably nephrite jade) and chalcedony were found in the rivers and the people "live by manufacture and trade".  He also wrote of their custom: "...if a married man goes to a distance from home to be absent twenty days, his wife has a right, if she is inclined, to take another husband; and the men, on the same principle, marry wherever they happen to reside."

Gold mines were reported near Keriya in the 19th century.

In 2013, Xingfu and Hexie were listed as residential communities in the town.

In 2017, eight residential communities and seven villages were added to those listed as part of the town.

Administrative divisions

As of 2018, the town was made up of eighteen residential communities and twenty-four villages.

Residential communities (Mandarin Chinese Hanyu Pinyin-derived names):
Kunlun, Jiande, Tuanjie, Yucheng, Wusitangbeixi/Wusitangbashi, Aitika, Tanaibeixi/Tanaiyibeixi, Dunbage, Xingfu, Hexie, Tianmei, Tianyuan, Chaoyang, Guangming, Kuaile, Guzai, Meigui, Kutazibeixi

Villages:
Guzai, Aremukamu, Mugakulebeixi/Mugakulebashi, Kaga, Ale, Tugemankuoqia, Andaikulebeixi/Andaikulebashi, Mugala, Bashikaqun, Ayagekaqun/Ayakekaqun, Yingqikai'airike/Yingqige'aireke, Kariman, Asiting'aoyi/Asitingwuyi, Wusitangwuqi, Kongkamazha, Kukairen, Bositan, Lüzhou, Taoyuan, Youyi, Akeyilaike, Maidiniyeti, Yitipake, Keliya

In 2009, residential communities and villages in the town were:

Residential communities (Mandarin Chinese Hanyu Pinyin-derived names):
 Kunlun, Jiande, Tuanjie, Yucheng, Wusitangbeixi, Aitika, Tanaibeixi, Dunbage

Villages:
 Guzai, Aremukamu, Mugakulebeixi, Kaga, Ale, Tugemankuoqia, Andaikulebeixi, Mugala, Bashikaqun, Ayagekaqun, Yingqikai'airike, Kariman, Asiting'aoyi, Wusitangwuqi, Kongkamazha, Kukairen, Bositan

Transportation
 China National Highway 315

References

Further reading
 Baumer, Christoph. 2000. Southern Silk Road: In the Footsteps of Sir Aurel Stein and Sven Hedin. White Orchid Books. Bangkok.
 Bonavia, Judy 2004. The Silk Road From Xi’an to Kashgar. Revised by Chrisoph Baumer. 2004. Odyssey Publications. 
 Hulsewé, A. F. P. (1979). China in Central Asia: The Early Stage 125 BC – AD 23: an annotated translation of chapters 61 and 96 of the History of the Former Han Dynasty. E. J. Brill, Leiden.
 Latham, Ronald. 1958. The Travels of Marco Polo. Translated and Introduced by Ronald Latham. Reprint 1982 by Abaris Books, New York. 
 Mallory, J. P. and Mair, Victor H. (2000). The Tarim Mummies: Ancient China and the Mystery of the Earliest Peoples from the West. Thames & Hudson. London. 
 Skrine, C. P. 1926. Chinese Central Asia. Methuen, London. Reprint: Barnes & Noble, New York. 1971.
 Stein, M. Aurel 1907. Ancient Khotan: Detailed report of archaeological explorations in Chinese Turkestan, 2 vols. Oxford. Clarendon Press.
 Stein, M. Aurel 1912. Ruins of Desert Cathay: Personal narrative of explorations in Central Asia and westernmost China, 2 vols. Reprint: Delhi. Low Price Publications. 1990.
 Stein, M. Aurel 1921. Serindia: Detailed report of explorations in Central Asia and westernmost China, 5 vols. London. Oxford. Clarendon Press. Reprint: Delhi. Motilal Banarsidass. 1980.
 Yu, Taishan. 2004. A History of the Relationships between the Western and Eastern Han, Wei, Jin, Northern and Southern Dynasties and the Western Regions. Sino-Platonic Papers No. 131 March, 2004. Dept. of East Asian Languages and Civilizations, University of Pennsylvania.

External links
 3000-year-old archaeological finds at Liushui Village, Yutian County 
 Archaeological GIS and Oasis Geography in the Tarim Basin 

Populated places along the Silk Road
Central Asian Buddhist sites
Populated places in Xinjiang
Ancient peoples of China
Former countries in Chinese history
Oases of China
Township-level divisions of Xinjiang